There are 18 National Natural Landmarks in the U.S. state of Washington, out of nearly 600 National Natural Landmarks in the United States.

References
General
 
 

Footnotes

Washington

Washington (state) geography-related lists